Dragan Škrba (Serbian Cyrillic: Драган Шкрба; born 26 August 1962) is a Bosnian retired goalkeeper.

Club career
Škrba played in 229 official matches for Željezničar Sarajevo and was a well known penalty stopper. He was a part of the great generation which have managed to reach the 1984-1985 UEFA Cup semifinals, which they lost on aggregate due to a very late goal by Videoton defender József Csuhay.

References

External links
 

1962 births
Living people
Footballers from Sarajevo
Serbs of Bosnia and Herzegovina
Association football goalkeepers
Yugoslav footballers
Bosnia and Herzegovina footballers
FK Željezničar Sarajevo players
Portimonense S.C. players
Pohang Steelers players
Yugoslav First League players
Primeira Liga players
K League 1 players
Bosnia and Herzegovina expatriate footballers
Expatriate footballers in Portugal
Bosnia and Herzegovina expatriate sportspeople in Portugal
Expatriate footballers in South Korea
Bosnia and Herzegovina expatriate sportspeople in South Korea